O My Heart (Stylised as "O My ♡") is the second album by Vancouver-based indie rock band Mother Mother, released in 2008. Videos for the songs "O My Heart", "Body of Years", and "Hayloft" were released. In late 2020, "Hayloft", "Arms Tonite", and "Wrecking Ball" went viral on the video-sharing app TikTok.

"Hayloft II", a sequel to "Hayloft", was released on the deluxe edition of the band's 2021 album Inside.

Track listing
All songs written by Ryan Guldemond.

Personnel

Mother Mother
 Ryan Guldemond – guitar, vocals 
 Molly Guldemond – vocals, keyboard 
 Debra-Jean Creelman – keyboard, vocals 
 Ali Siadat – drums 
 Jeremy Page – bass, clarinet, bass clarinet, tenor sax, backing vocals

Additional personnel
 Peggy Lee – cello
 Tyson Naylor – organ, piano
 JL Carter – trumpet
 JP Carter – trumpet
 Shawn Penner – synthesizer, backing vocals
 Rebecca Whitling – violin

Production
 Howard Redekopp – producer, engineer, mixer
 Steve Hall – mastering
 Molly Guldemond – artwork, design

References

Mother Mother albums
2008 albums